Bring in 'da Noise, Bring in 'da Funk is a musical that debuted Off-Broadway at the New York Shakespeare Festival/Public Theater in 1995 and moved to Broadway in 1996. The show was conceived and directed by George C. Wolfe, and featured music by Daryl Waters, Zane Mark and Ann Duquesnay; lyrics by Reg E. Gaines, George C. Wolfe and Ann Duquesnay; and a book by Reg E. Gaines. The choreography was by Savion Glover.

Productions
Bring in 'da Noise, Bring in 'da Funk premiered off-Broadway at the Public Theater's Newman Theatre on November 3, 1995, and closed on January 28, 1996, after 85 performances. Directed by George C. Wolfe with costumes by Karen Perry, set design by Ricardo Hernandez, lighting by Jules Fisher and Peggy Eisenhauer, and Production Managed by Bonnie Metzgar. The cast included Savion Glover, Duquesnay, Gaines, and Dulé Hill.

The musical moved to the Ambassador Theatre on Broadway, opening there on April 25, 1996. The show closed after 1135 performances on January 10, 1999. The opening night cast included Jeffrey Wright, Glover, Duquesnay and Hill. Again directed by Wolfe, with sets and lighting by the off-Broadway team, costume design was by Paul Tazewell. Glover left the show but returned for 40 performances from December 8, 1998, through January 10, 1999.

Glover toured with the musical in 2002.

The Original Broadway Cast recording was issued by RCA Victor  (09026-68565-2).

Concept
Bring in 'da Noise, Bring in 'da Funk is a musical revue telling the story, through tap, of black history from slavery to the present. The musical numbers are presented along with supertitles, projected images and videotapes and with continuing commentary.

Wolfe took the rap words of Reg E. Gaines and turned them into "tap/rap (tap dancing informed by hip-hop and funk rhythms)."

Songs

Act 1
 Bring in 'da Noise Bring in 'da Funk 
 The Door to Isle Goree
 Slave Ships
 Som'thin' From Nuthin'/ The Circle Stomp
 The Pan Handlers
 The Lynching Blues 
 Chicago Bound
 Shifting Sounds 
 Industrialization 
 The Chicago Riot Rag 
 I Got the Beat/Dark Tower 
 The Whirligig Stomp 

Act 2
 Now That's Tap Grin & Flash 
 The Uncle Huck-a-Buck Song 
 Kid Go! 
 The Lost Beat Swing 
 1956, Them Conkheads 
 1967, Hot Fun 
 1977, Blackout 
 1987, Gospel/Hip Hop Rant 
 Drummin' 
 Taxi 
 Conversations 
 Bring in 'da Noise Bring in 'da Funk (Reprise)

Response
The New York Times review said that "Mr. Glover has found choreographic equivalents for the black experience in the days of plantations, urban industrialization, the Harlem Renaissance and latter-day race riots...This sense of flaming individuality is finally what the evening is about: not just the collective history of a race but the diverse and specific forms of expression that one tradition embraces."

The show is "an explosive and bravely literal-minded chronicle of the genre's history from slavery to the present. The music is beautiful and the dancing exuberant, but Funk is serious business, with vicious, funny send-ups of Uncle Tomism in Hollywood."

The New York Times wrote: "as dance, as musical, as theater, as art, as history and entertainment, there's nothing Noise/Funk cannot and should not do." (Margo Jefferson)

The musical made an "extraordinary political statement  ...  as well as the equally significant growth in dance this show launched."

Awards and nominations

Original Broadway production

Notes

References
 Hill, Errol. "A History of African American Theatre" (2003). Cambridge University Press, p. 439

External links 
 Bring in 'da Noise, Bring in 'da Funk at the Internet Off-Broadway Database

Souvenir Brochure Design
Bring in 'da Noise, Bring in 'da Funk photos and Original Broadway Cast Recording details

1995 musicals
Broadway musicals
All-Black cast Broadway shows
Plays by George C. Wolfe
Off-Broadway musicals
Tony Award-winning musicals